"A Little Bit Alexis" is a song performed by Annie Murphy on the Canadian sitcom Schitt's Creek. The song first appeared in the episode "The Hospies", and was later released commercially as an independent single on February 27, 2019. Partial proceeds from the song were donated to MusiCounts, a Canadian organization providing music resources to schools in need.

Background and composition 
"A Little Bit Alexis" was originally written into the script for "The Hospies" without lyrics, which were later written by Murphy by her own request. The track was produced by Murphy's husband Menno Versteeg and his Hollerado bandmate Nixon Boyd. The three were inspired by the music of Paris Hilton, Lindsay Lohan, and Britney Spears. The song became popular on the video-sharing platform TikTok, where fans would lip-sync and perform the original dance from the episode.

Live performances 
Murphy performed the song as a duet with Kelly Clarkson on The Kelly Clarkson Show. Clarkson adapted the lyrics as "A Whole Lotta Texas".

Charts

References

2019 songs
Canadian pop songs
Novelty songs
Schitt's Creek
2019 debut singles
Songs from television series